WC2 may stand for: 
 WC2, a postcode district in the WC postcode area for central London
 White Collar-2, a blue light photoreceptor in fungi
 Wing Commander II: Vengeance of the Kilrathi, a 1991 space combat simulation video game
 Warcraft II: Tides of Darkness, a 1995 real-time strategy video game
 Warcraft II: Beyond the Dark Portal, expansion pack to Tides of Darkness
 WC2 University Network, a network of universities around the world